BBQ Blitz is an American cooking-themed television series that airs on Food Network. It is presented by chef and former American football player Eddie Jackson, who had most recently come to prominence as the winner of the eleventh season of the Food Network series Food Network Star. The series features Jackson traveling to different locations within the United States and overseeing a cooking competition between three participants, with the winner receiving a prize of $5,000 as well as "BBQ bragging rights".

BBQ Blitz premiered on October 9, 2015.

References

External links
 
 

2010s American cooking television series
2015 American television series debuts
Cooking competitions in the United States
English-language television shows
Food Network original programming
Food reality television series